The Land of Stories is a series of children's fiction, adventure and fantasy books written by American author, actor and singer Chris Colfer. The first book, The Wishing Spell, was released on July 17, 2012. The sixth book was published in July 2017. During a live video chat, Colfer revealed plans for a prequel series, which have now been published. The books are described by Colfer as a "modern-day fairy tale", following twins Alex and Conner Bailey as they fall from the real world into a world full of fairy tales they have only ever read about before and discovering there is more to this world than meets the eye.

Books

The Wishing Spell 
The first book in the series, The Wishing Spell was published on July 17, 2012.

A year and 9 months have gone by since twins Alex and Conner Bailey lost their father in a car accident. Their mother is trying to balance her job and her family. On Alex and Conner's twelfth birthday, their grandmother gives them an old fairy tale book from her childhood. Alex realizes that the book hums, glows, and eventually sucks items into its pages. Against Conner's advice to throw the book away, Alex keeps the book and eventually reaches into it, after experimenting by throwing pencils and books inside. Conner barges in to stop Alex from going into the book, but doing so, startling Alex, and therefore making her fall into the book. Conner jumps in to help Alex. They find out the book is a portal to the fairy-tale world. There, they meet Froggy, a man turned into a frog. Froggy gives them a journal that tells of the Wishing Spell, and how to find it. The Wishing Spell is a spell that can grant whatever wish the person wants if the person has a specific eight items. Hoping to return to the real world, Alex and Conner set off to find the Wishing Spell items. They later meet another person who was later identified as the Huntsman's daughter, the Huntress. Alex and Conner realize that the Huntress is working for the Evil Queen to get the Wishing Spell as well. They find out that the Wishing Spell can only be used twice, and the man who wrote the journal already used it. The Evil Queen gets this message from her magic mirror as well, and begins a desperate race to create the Wishing Spell. While they are collecting the ingredients for the Wishing spell, Alex and Conner come across many tales that their father had once told them. After a while, they face the conclusion that their father came from the fairy-tale world.

Finally, when Alex and Conner get all the items for the Wishing Spell, the Evil Queen kidnaps them, takes the items, and goes to her hiding place, North of the Sleeping Kingdom. There, Conner tries to prevent the Evil Queen from using the Wishing Spell by smashing the fairy tear bottle, one of the items needed in the Wishing Spell. The Evil Queen tells her story: When she was little, she was named Evly, and she was a kind and caring girl. She fell in love with a young boy named Mira, but the Enchantress captured her and stopped her from meeting him. Evly tried to send secret messages to Mira, but the Enchantress found out and imprisoned Mira in a mirror. Evly later killed the Enchantress, but she couldn't do anything to bring Mira back until she found out about the Wishing Spell. Due to the story, Alex sheds a few tears. The Evil Queen gets one of Alex's tears, puts it with the items of the Wishing Spell, and the Wishing Spell activates. Mira is freed from the magic mirror, but he is nearly dead. The rescue team, led by Froggy, arrives. Mira dies in Evly's arms, and they are both swallowed up by the Queen's magic mirror when it falls. In the fighting that follows, the Huntsman and his daughter are killed, and Alex and Conner are rescued. Froggy is found to be the long-lost Prince Charlie from the Charming Kingdom, and Alex and Conner learn that their grandmother is the Fairy Godmother, who is capable of making portals between the Otherworld and the fairy-tale world. The journal written by the man who had completed the Wishing Spell years before was written by their father: Therefore, Alex and Conner are part fairy. Alex and Conner return to the real world.

The Enchantress Returns
The Enchantress Returns is the second book in the series and was published on August 6, 2013.

Alex heads home after attending school and finds her brother Conner, who is worried because their mother has yet to come home from work. He also found a romantic note to their mother from a surgeon she worked with named Dr. Bob, who brought them a puppy. When Charlotte comes home, Alex and Conner ask if Charlotte has a boyfriend. Their mother tells them that it's true. Later on, Bob goes to see the twins and tells them about his plan to propose to their mother. He shows them the ring, which has two large diamonds on it, one pink and one blue to represent the twins. When Bob asks the twins for permission about the proposal, Conner and Alex decide that this would make both Bob and their mom happy, so they agree.

All three then decided to surprise Charlotte with a special dinner at the Bailey house the next Thursday at six. Alex returns home as quickly as she can from a course she was taking at a community college, and Bob tells the people he works with at the hospital to keep Charlotte busy so she won't come home early. The twins' mother, Charlotte Bailey, doesn't show up on time, but another nurse at the hospital says that she had left two hours ago. They then hear a mysterious knock at the door and a bunch of fairy tale soldiers from the Charming Kingdom barge in. Bob was originally shocked, then doubtful, but he later accepts that the Fairy Tale world exists. The twins' grandmother, the Fairy Godmother, enters and explains that their mother was kidnapped. While their grandmother attends to her own business, Xanthous (a member of the Fairy Council) and Sir Lampton (their father's old friend) watch over them until Mother Goose, their grandma's closest friend takes over babysitting the twins. Later, Alex gives Mother Goose alcohol until she becomes drunk, and Alex asks her for information, which she unknowingly gives.

Alex discovers that her mother was captured by Ezmia, the "Enchantress", who cursed Sleeping Beauty as a young baby, and that the Sleeping Kingdom was in ruin. Since she couldn't get to the Land of Stories through the book, she sneaks out of the house and bikes to her grandmother's house, hoping to find a way to the Land of Stories. The next day, she almost falls off of a bridge. Unexpectedly, Conner saves her and admits that he had followed her. They eventually go to their grandmother's house, which had a glowing painting in it. Alex knows that this is a portal to the fairy-tale world. Suddenly, Alex and Conner find themselves in The Land of Stories. They eventually find Froggy, who is once again in frog form as a disguise, after being turned back into a human at the end of the first book. All three travel to the Red Riding Hood Kingdom, where the Enchantress seemed to be destroying symbolic historic sights. Alex and Conner then attend a meeting only for the kings and queens by persuading Red to wear a dress that they could hide under. At the meeting, the Enchantress captures Alex and Conner's grandmother, revealing that she had captured 'Alex', but instead got Charlotte, their mother, who pretended to be Alex. At Red's castle, Conner learns of something called the Wand of Wonderment, which makes the holder invincible. To create it, one must find the six most valuable things of the six most hated people in the world. To help find all the items, Red asks the villagers to all pitch in to make a flying ship out of all her baskets.

When the ship is completed, Alex, Conner, Red, Froggy, Goldilocks, and Jack fly the ship across The Land of Stories. They obtain the ice scepter of The Snow Queen, the wedding ring of Cinderella's stepmother, the giant's harp, the glass from the Evil Queen's mirror, and the jewels of the Sea Witch. However, they are unclear on what the Enchantress's most prized possession is. After landing in the Troll and Goblin territory, they discover that Trollbella, a female troll that likes Conner, is now queen and that Bob traveled to the Land of Stories as well. They meet the ghost of Old Queen Beauty in the Eastern Kingdom, who says that the Enchantress' most prized possession is her pride.

The Enchantress uses her vines to drag Conner, Red, Froggy, Goldilocks, and Jack to the coliseum. Alex tries to defeat Ezmia by subtly stealing her pride, but she is blasted off of the coliseum. Because she was holding the Wand of Wonderment, she is saved from death. However, when she reaches the ground, she faints. Alex then has a dream that she was talking to Alice from Alice in Wonderland, Lucy from Narnia, Dorothy Gale from Oz, and Wendy Darling from Neverland, who advise her on the situation. Alex wakes up and goes back up the coliseum using a flying horse. When she arrives, she drops the Wand in front of Ezmia. Ezmia tries to kill Alex with the Wand after Alex stripped her of her powers (until Ezmia got hold of the Wand of Wonderment) but Rumpelstiltskin jumps in front of the blast to save Alex out of guilt for what he has tried to do for Ezmia. Conner destroys the Wand, so all the magic is taken from Ezmia's body and she dies.

After that, Bob finally proposes to Charlotte and they get married in Queen Cinderella's castle for Queen Cinderella to thank Charlotte for taking care of their baby. When it is time to leave, Alex claims that she is meant to stay in the Land of Stories and that Conner should share their stories in the real world. The twins then believe that they were to be separated forever after the fairies decided to seal all portals leading to and from The Land of Stories. Later, Conner fetches Cinderella's stepmother and stepsisters to go back to his world, Conner also shares their stories in the Otherworld.

A Grimm Warning
A Grimm Warning is the third installment in the series and was published on July 8, 2014.

At the beginning of the third book, Alex is in her coronation as Fairy Godmother. Meanwhile, Conner is at school in the real world and is questioned about where his sister is. Conner goes on a school trip to Germany to hear never before heard stories by the Brothers Grimm that was recently found in a time capsule. The good news for Conner is that the girl he has a crush on, Bree Campbell, is attending. The bad news is that four rude girls called the Book Huggers are also going.

As for Alex, she keeps messing up her spells. She eventually meets a farm boy named Rook Robins, whom she takes liking into. She becomes torn later in the story because her grandmother is dying and she feels like she is killing her. The fairy godmother is dying because she finally finds a replacement; now the Fairy Godmother can rest knowing the fairy tale world rests in good hands.

Conner finds out that one of the stories is a secret message and a warning for the Land of Stories. He sets out across Germany to crack a 200-year code. With Bree's help and the directions of Mother Goose, Conner eventually meets Emmerich Himmelsbach, a little boy from a small village.

Alex and Conner realize that time-displaced soldiers of the Grande Armée from their world are coming to the Fairy Tale world. The army is led by General Jacques Du Marquis, with the help of the Masked Man, a prisoner he freed during a raid on Pinocchio Prison. When some villagers are attacked by the Grande Armée, Rook (Alex's crush and first kiss) is blackmailed by the army into giving up the location of Alex and the royal families.

Alex's grandmother, the Fairy Godmother, eventually defeats the Masked Man's dragon with her fairy magic and "returns to magic". Alex figures out that Rook is the person who leaked out information. She is hurt by this and decides to break up with him. Rook tries to regain her trust by helping her in the next stories. Alex feels sad about leaving him but knows she has done the right thing. At the end of the book, Alex encounters the Masked Man without his mask and becomes convinced he is the twins' deceased father, John Bailey.

Beyond the Kingdoms
Beyond the Kingdoms is the fourth installment in the series and was published on July 7, 2015.

The book begins with the Bailey twins chasing the Masked Man, who Alex believes is their late father. Conner is unconvinced, though. Alex is going through apparent mood swings, in which her hair would float above her head and her eyes would glow. She has a hard time controlling her emotions which cause her to attack many people with her magic, including her family and friends. Alex insists to the fairy council that the Masked Man should be one of their highest priorities. As a result, she is 'un-godmothered' and kicked out of the fairy council. Alex loses her temper and her control of her magic and shoots at the fairy council with lightning and vanishes in a wall of fire. She arrives at the Giant's castle after her wall of fire exit where Mother Goose is staying.

Later on, at Red and Froggy's wedding, Morina the beauty witch arrives and claims to be Froggy's first lover (and the one who cursed him to live as a frog). She threatens to curse Red if he doesn't leave with her, causing Froggy to choose to leave with her, as Morina is a powerful entity. Meanwhile, Conner gets beaten up by the Masked Man while getting the wedding rings for Red and Froggy in the library as the Masked man attempts to steal books. Conner rips off his mask, and he also believes the Masked Man is their father. That night, Alex wishes to speak with her late grandmother. Her grandmother then sends an "angel moth from outer space" of memories from the stars to tell Alex the true story of the Masked Man: he is their uncle Lloyd.

Conner's old friend Trix the fairy stole a book from his grandmother's possession. From the book, they learn that what Lloyd attempted to steal was a Portal Potion, which can transport anyone into any work of fiction. The ingredients to the potion are a branch from the oldest tree in the woods, a feather from the finest pheasant in the sky, a liquefied lock and key that belonged to a loved one, two weeks of moonlight, and a spark of magic. Alex then explains to the others that the Masked Man is their uncle and not their father. Conner says she is crazy, but Mother Goose confirms that it is true and that it was their grandmother's final wish for her not to tell. The group then travels into the works of literature in an attempt to stop their uncle before he recruits an army of literary villains.

Alex and Conner are trapped in separate worlds by Lloyd after they pursued him into The Wizard of Oz, Neverland, and Alice in Wonderland. In Wonderland the twins are led into a trap where the twins are stuck in different stories. Alex is trapped in the world of King Arthur while Conner is trapped in the land of Robin Hood. After they escape and meet up in the land of Oz, they realize that Lloyd has sent armies to destroy the kingdoms and that they need to return home for supplies. They leave for the Otherworld on a cliffhanger – they will not go into any published stories, but into Conner's own short stories to recruit a literary army of their own.

An Author's Odyssey
An Author's Odyssey is the fifth installment in the series and was published on December 14, 2015.

When the twins and their friends enter worlds crafted from Conner's imagination, finding allies no one else could have ever dreamed of, as well as recovering many memories they had made in the fairy-tale world, the long-awaited race begins to put an end to the Masked Man's reign of terror. Conner and Alex spend time in Conner's short stories ranging from battling pirates to racing in an ancient pyramid filled with a thousand zombie mummies with the story's main protagonist. Conner brought his mother, Charlotte Bailey, on the mummy adventure. In the meantime, the Sea Witch and the Snow Queen along with the witches at Dead Man's Creek had other plans. The Snow Queen and the Sea Witch plan to give a handful of evil dust to Alex. This dust was made from a magic mirror created by terrible demons. The dust was also given to the evil and terrifying Enchantress whom Alex killed in the second book. The reason the enchantress was so horrible was because of the dust, which not only raised her temper but caused heartache worse than one could ever imagine. The Snow Queen and the Sea Witch believe the dust will work the same evil magic on Alex, as they have used it before on her. When Alex goes to the bathroom, Morina throws the dust into Alex's face. Meanwhile, Conner and his friends are attacked by Lloyd who forces them to do a blood transfusion from Emmerich onto him, as Emmerich is Lloyd's son. Conner defeats Lloyd by trapping him in one of Bree's stories but then finds out that Alex has vanished.

Worlds Collide
The sixth and final book in the series, titled Worlds Collide, was released on July 11, 2017.

After a prologue in which Conner, now 80 years old, is celebrating his birthday at a bookstore, and realizes he doesn't know what happened to Alex, he begins reading his last book. The story starts with Alex, still under the witches' control, wreaking havoc at the New York Public Library. Conner realizes this and sets out to New York City accompanied by Red, Jack, Goldilocks, and Bree. There are a few mishaps at the airport, such as Red buying a lot of items at a gift shop, but they get on the plane safely. When they arrive, the Book Huggers, sitting in a restaurant, see Conner and tell their parents. However, Conner ducks, and the parents don't see him. Then as Conner's group attempts to make it into the library, a homeless man named Rusty who had helped them earlier for money leads them to a subway tunnel that was abandoned in the '20s and heads directly under the library. While there, they hear from other homeless people and realize a portal between the worlds is going to open up in the library. They break into the library and see Alex, currently under Morina's control, and the witch keeps them quiet. While sleeping, Conner gets a message from Alex saying that she wants him to kill her so she can "return to magic" and break free from the curse.

The Book Huggers rescue Conner and the gang. The Fairy Council and other heroes battle and defeat the witches and villains. Meanwhile, Alex is causing more chaos against her will. After the Literary Army was destroyed, Conner wrote a story, where he and Alex never explored the Land of Stories. In the story, Alex is not affected by the curse, and they see their father. Alex then gets emotional to the point the curse disintegrates and they leave just in time before the story ended. They then repair New York using healing flames and a week later, met the president. They explain to her to safeguard the Land of Stories book to ensure a catastrophe never happens again like that of the Literary Army. The series ends with 65 years later where Conner, now 80, is going to be relocated to a retirement home because his children believe he is crazy. His granddaughter Charlotte "Charlie" Black visits him as he is about to visit Alex. He then exits to the Fairy Tale world. The series ends with Charlie hearing a sound and going to the attic and seeing the Land of Stories book shine. After all that has happened, Alex and Conner meet back together, safe and sound.

Development
Colfer recorded his audiobook using his voice. The Land of Stories: The Wishing Spell has been translated into several languages, including Spanish, Japanese, Russian, Italian, French, Hebrew, Greek, Portuguese (Brazil), and Dutch.

Characters

Heroes
Alexandra Marie Bailey is a smart, curious girl, described as having bright blue eyes and short, strawberry-blond hair with a headband always in it. She is studious and pays close attention to every class, getting full marks. She is also considered the teacher's pet but doesn't have any friends. She is the twin sister to Conner Bailey. She is one of the most powerful fairies ever known. She also is the reason why the twins went into the Land of Stories in the first place.
Conner Jonathan Bailey is a boy who looks much like his twin sister Alex Bailey. He falls asleep often in class and is a slacker. He is sociable but feels constantly overshadowed by his brainy sister. He holds a deep hatred for his teacher, Mrs. Peters. However, she eventually inspires Conner to become a writer and in Book 5, Conner travels into his short stories. In the last book, it is revealed that Conner and Bree marry and have children together. Throughout his life, Conner becomes a famous and successful author.
Charlie Carlton 'Froggy' Charming is a large, slightly humanoid frog. Formerly, Prince Charlie Charming, a curse was placed upon him for being too vain. We find out later on that he was cursed by a witch named Morina, who cursed him so that he was ashamed of the way he looked, as she thought he ended their relationship because of her looks. He is wise and gives the twins advice and help throughout the story. In the beginning, he is embarrassed about being a frog and lives in a sort of house-hole in the dwarf forests. Later on, he is elected king of the Center Kingdom. In Beyond the Kingdoms he is imprisoned in a magic mirror to protect Red. In the final book, he is freed from the mirror after performing a good deed. He then marries Red after being freed.
Red Riding Hood is the queen of the Red Riding Hood Kingdom. She can be snarky, self-centered and clueless at times, but is compassionate and loyal at heart. She can also be surprisingly smart and courageous. Her lover used to be Jack, but he would always turn her away in favor of Goldilocks. Though she is initially repulsed by him due to him being a frog, Red eventually falls in love with Froggy after learning that he used to be a prince. Red also dislikes gross stuff. During A Grimm Warning, Little Bo Peep temporarily took over her throne, but Red got her throne back. In Beyond the Kingdoms, Red and Froggy's wedding is crashed by Morina, who threatens Red in order to kidnap Froggy. Froggy turns Red away and goes with Morina to protect Red. In Worlds Collide, she saves her friends from Morina, killing her with a hand mirror. She finally marries Froggy and adopts the Lost Boys from Neverland.
Jack is now a grown man with the other Fairy Tale characters, who grew a famous beanstalk when he was younger. Despite Red's affection towards him, he rejects her and falls in love with Goldilocks. Because of his love for her, he decides to join Goldilocks on the run, no matter the consequences. He marries Goldilocks in the third book, and in the fifth book, they have a child and name him Hero.
Goldilocks is a tough and fearless criminal who raids kingdoms. She was given her first sword to fight with by Hagetta, a kind witch who lives in the Dwarf Forests. She married Jack in the third book. In the fourth book, she became pregnant with his child. In the fifth book, she gave birth to a baby boy and named him Hero.
Fairy Godmother (Brystal Lynn Evergreen) is Alex and Conner's grandmother and leads the Fairy Council through bad times and also is the only one who can create a portal between the fairy-tale world and the Otherworld. She is shown as a kind old woman with a nice hairdo. She dies in A Grimm Warning after slaying a dragon. It is revealed in A Tale of Magic... that her real name is Brystal Lynn Evergreen.
Mother Goose (Lucy Goose) can travel between worlds (with the Fairy Godmother) and reads nursery rhymes around the world to children. She is part of the Fairy Council. She is first mentioned in The Wishing Spell, and appears in The Enchantress Returns, A Grimm Warning and Beyond the Kingdoms. She "retires" and joins Merlin in his story in Beyond the Kingdoms. She likes to gamble and travel with her pet gander, Lester. It is revealed in A Tale of Magic... that her name is Lucy Goose.
Breanne 'Bree' Campbell is an intelligent and determined girl. She was first introduced in A Grimm Warning as a classmate of Conner Bailey. She is a horror writer and is described as beautiful. She has blonde hair with a streak of pink and blue and always wears a purple beanie and an earbud in one ear. Conner has a huge crush on Bree, and at the end of A Grimm Warning, Bree reveals that she has a crush on him too. She becomes close friends with Emmerich, whom she meets during the trip to Europe. In the last book, it is revealed that Conner and Bree marry and have children together. After they marry, she changes her name to Breanne Campbell-Bailey.                    
Emmerich Himmelsbach is a boy from Hohenschwangau, Germany, and approximately ten years old. He first appears in A Grimm Warning. He helps Conner and Bree get into Neuschwanstein castle and ends up joining Conner on his adventure to save the Land of Stories. In Beyond the Kingdoms, he turns out to be the son of Bo Peep and Lloyd Bailey, the Masked Man and the twins' uncle, therefore making Emmerich the twins' cousin.
Rook Robins is a farmer's son and the love interest of Alex Bailey in A Grimm Warning, though they break up after he told the general about the secret path. He makes her understand that he did what he thought was right when he died in Worlds Collide to a sniper bullet saving her life.
The Book Huggers are a group of intelligent girls who are on to Alex and Conner. Their names are Mindy McClowsky, Cindy Strutherbergers, Lindy Lenkins and Wendy Takahashi. Originally, they ran the book club at their school. But after Alex and Conner's suspicious disappearance, they abandon it in favor of a conspiracy club. Everybody thinks they hit their heads, but they know what they see. They are eccentric. Wendy is selectively mute and is sometimes ignored a bit because of that. In the last book, they followed Conner and his friends. When the Book Huggers find them trapped in the library, they interrogate Conner until he admits what has been going on in the last few years and apologises, only then they set Conner and his friends free. In one of the last chapters, it is mentioned that they are the Sister Grimm's new recruits.
Auburn Sally is a character from "Starboardia", one of Conner's short stories. She is based on Goldilocks and is a pirate who sails with her crew aboard their ship the Dolly Llama. Conner barely manages to convince her to be part of his army. They are forced to battle Smoky Sails, Sam when he attacks them. Auburn Sally appears in An Author's Odyssey, and Worlds Collide
King Arthur is the king of Camelot and love interest of Alex Bailey in Beyond the Kingdoms but they have to end their relationship because Alex had to stop the Masked Man. She convinces him to fulfill his destiny.
However, he always retains a romantic longing for Alex
Charlotte and John Bailey are the parents of Alex and Conner. John died in a car crash before the first book, leaving Charlotte on her own until the second book when she marries Bob. Charlotte and Bob are active in the Land of Stories in the second book. 
The Ziblings, The Cyborg Queen, Newters, Beau and other Blimp Boy Characters, the sailors from the Dolly Llama, Admiral Jacobson, and his men are heroes of Conner's imagination and are from his four short stories. He recruits them for his literary army, and they help Alex and Conner fight in the sixth book, Worlds Collide.
Dr. Bob is the second husband of Charlotte Bailey and the stepfather of Alex and Connor Bailey. He is a doctor and a kind person. He bought a dog named Buster (who they didn't know was Sir Lampton) for the Baileys.

Royals
Queen Cinderella: Queen of the Charming Kingdom. Her first appearance in The Wishing Spell portrays her as heavily pregnant with King Chance Charming's child, later named Princess Hope.
Queen Sleeping Beauty: Queen of the Eastern Kingdom. Due to the century-long curse, she, along with the other women in her kingdom, is rendered unable to bear children. However, she adopts a recently orphaned girl named Ash in A Grimm Warning from a ransacked and burnt town.
Princess Hope: Daughter of Queen Cinderella and King Chance Charming. Princess of the Charming Kingdom.
Princess Ash: Adopted daughter of Queen Sleeping Beauty and King Chase Charming. Princess of the Eastern Kingdom. Sleeping Beauty saves her life while the Royals are on the enchanted path. She adopts her because the sleeping curse has made her infertile, but she wishes for a child. Ash is found in a chest in the burning remains of an attacked town.
Queen Rapunzel: Queen of the Corner Kingdom.
Queen Bo Peep: Queen of the Bo Peep Republic. She was crowned Queen after she challenged Queen Red Riding Hood for the Throne yet Bo Peep passed away from a broken heart in the third book by the masked man.
Queen Snow White: Queen of the Northern Kingdom. She is revealed to be the one who releases her stepmother from the dungeon out of genuine sympathy for her plight. 
Sir William: Queen Rapunzel's husband and King of the Corner Kingdom.
King Chance Charming: King of the Charming Kingdom and Queen Cinderella's Husband.
King Chandler Charming: King of the Northern Kingdom and Husband of Snow White.
King Chase Charming: King of the Eastern Kingdom and Queen Sleeping Beauty's husband.
King Chester Charming: Deceased father of the four Charming Kings.
Ghost of Queen Beauty: The Ghost living in the Eastern/Sleeping Kingdom from the story Beauty and the Beast. Grandmother of Queen Sleeping Beauty. Known as the Lady of the East.
Sir Lampton: The Head of Queen Cinderella's Royal Guard who transforms into a dog named Buster.
Sir Grant: The Head of Queen Snow White's Royal Guard. He leads the Northern Kingdom Army against the Evil Queen.

Villains 
Evly, The Evil Queen is Snow White's stepmother. The whole Fairy tale world thought she was vain and power-obsessed, but she really only wanted to free her lover, Mira, from her magic mirror. Mira had been put in the magic mirror by Ezmia, the Enchantress. After the battle at her palace in The Wishing Spell, she is trapped by the mirror which had once held Mira and was transformed into a hopeless version of her old self, wandering the mirror realm in the vain hope of finding her lost lover. In Worlds Collide, the effects of the mirror caused her to forget herself and her memories. This caused her to revert into a young girl. She is soon discovered by Froggy, who was at the time, cursed by Morina, the Beauty Witch into his own mirror, and together they set off to warn his friends of the plot the fairytale villains have. She is released from the mirror realm by offering words of wisdom to a woman who's self-esteem was shattered by her looks. After being released, she reverted to her true, middle-aged self. Evly's final fate is unknown; however, it appears that she has a brighter future with her complete reformation.
Ezmia, The Enchantress was cursed by the witches to hate everyone and tried to destroy the world. This same curse was placed on Alex Bailey in the 5th book. Ezmia was once a small girl living in the Otherworld in misery following the death of her parents and the destruction of her village. She was to be killed by ruthless soldiers, but in an act of self-defence killed them instead. The Fairy Godmother, who had secretly watched this, took Ezmia under her wing as an apprentice. The Fairy Godmother even chose her as the next Fairy Godmother. Sadly, bitterness over men who failed her as well as what she claimed was the other fairies' jealousy caused her to renounce her title and turned to Dark Magic. She is defeated by Alex Bailey. It is later revealed, however, that it was the witches who cast a spell on her to turn to rage.
The Snow Queen/Madame Celeste Weatherberry is a blind weather witch who, a long time ago, secretly plotted against the king of the Northern Kingdom, whom she had befriended by granting him wishes and making prophecies. She overthrew the king and covered the kingdom in an everlasting winter. She was eventually overthrown by Prince White (Snow White's grandfather) and banished to the Northern Mountains, where she lives in an icy lair with her polar bears. She was featured introduced in the second book (The Land of Stories: The Enchantress Returns) as an antagonist. Conner, Alex, Goldilocks, Red, and Jack were exploring to find the 6 most prized items of the 6 most hated beings, the snow queen being one of them. Alex and Conner took her wand (which was later sliced in half by Conner) and used it to build the Wand of Wonderment. She was also revealed later as the one who found dust of an evil mirror from the past which turned Ezmia into the evil enchantress.
Morina is an evil witch who cursed Froggy to look like a frog and trapped him into the magic mirror. She does this because he ended their relationship. Her grandfather was a troll. As a result, she was ugly when she was young. She spent years creating potions that improved her appearance little by little. Morina now looks like a beautiful lady but she has ram's horns on her head. She spends her time selling her potions to customers who want to become better looking. The potions are created by draining the youth of children.
The Demon Mirror is a mirror mentioned in The Land of Stories: An Author's Odyssey. It was said to be a weapon used by the demons that inhabited the fairy tale world (See book 5 for that story), and turned anything in its reflection ugly and evil. it shatters when the demons attempt to bring it to heaven to torture the angels, and the fragments turn to dust. the dust is then later used to curse Alex to use her in the 6th book.
The Masked Man/Lloyd Bailey is the main antagonist in books 3, 4 and 5. In book 4, it is revealed that the Masked Man is Alex and Conner's uncle Lloyd. In book 5 Emmerich is revealed to him as his son and Little Bo Peep as his wife. His plot was to recruit an army of literatures greatest villains in order to overthrow the Kingdoms and take over the world. He dies at the end of book 5 by entering Bree's story "Cemetery of the Undead", being killed by Bo Peep and banished to his grave.
Smoky Sails Sam is a character in Conner's short story "Starboardia". He was originally a slave but became a pirate when he staged a mutiny on the ship that captured him. He wants to kill Auburn Sally because she stole a necklace called the Heart of the Caribbean from him.
General Jacques Du Marquis is the French general of the Grande Armée who wants to take over the fairy tale world. He appeared as the central antagonist in The Grimm Warning but died because of the Masked Man controlling a dragon. Colfer has said he had the inspiration for the character from all the corrupt people he’s met in his life.
The Sea Witch is a witch who is believed to have tricked the Little Mermaid into giving up her voice. She is one of the witches who plots to steal the Otherworld in the last few books of the series.
 The Queen Of Hearts is the villain from "Alice in Wonderland" where Alex and Conner Bailey chase the Masked Man in order to stop him from recruiting all the villains to create his Literary Army. The Queen Of Hearts loves cutting heads of servants and others who don't listen to her commands.
Captain Hook is the main antagonist from "Peter Pan" where Alex and Conner Bailey chase the Masked Man as well. Captain Hook briefly was recruited by the Masked Man before he defected from the Masked Man. His sworn enemy is Peter Pan and his right-hand-man is Mr. Smee.
The Wicked Witch Of The West is the main antagonist from "The Wonderful Wizard Of Oz" where Alex and Conner Bailey chase the Masked Man as well. She was recruited by the Masked Man before she defected from him. She has an army of Munchkins and flying monkeys, such as the baby monkey Blubo, who later turns against her.
Rumpelstiltskin is the secondary antagonist of the second book. He is a brother of the Seven Dwarves and is employed by Ezmia. He sacrifices himself at the end of the book, in hope of doing something good.
Charcoaline, Rat Mary, Serpentine, and Tarantulene are witches of the Witches' Brew. They are pawns of Ezmia, the Snow Queen and the Sea Witch. They were all killed in Worlds Collide. 
Colonel Rembert, Colonel Baton, and Capitaine De Lange are minor antagonists. They are part of the Grande Armée.

Animals
Porridge is the horse of Goldilocks. She mated with Buckle and had a foal, Oats, and accompanies Goldilocks in most of the adventures.
Clawdius is the wolf of Red Riding Hood. He was rescued by her during the events of the second book, in the Northern Mountains of the Northern Kingdom. He currently lives in the Center Kingdom. 
Cornelius is the unicorn of Alex. He is described as overweight and has a crooked horn. He accompanies Alex in many adventures and is good friends with Rook Robins. 
Buckle is an arrogant and wayward stallion and the mate of Porridge. He and Porridge had a foal, Oats, and he only accompanies the heroes in a few adventures.
The Dragon is an antagonistic creature. The Masked Man retrieved it in its egg form for General Marquis and later helped them try to destroy the Fairy Kingdom. It was killed by the Fairy Godmother.
Oats is the foal of Porridge and Buckle. He is energetic and adventurous.
George Clooney is the Giant's cat. Initially an antagonist, he was named George Clooney by Mother Goose and was tamed by her.

Supporting characters
Peter Pan, Robin Hood, the Merry Men, the Lost Boys, Tinker Bell, and Merlin are characters from classic fairytales and epics. The Bailey twins went through their stories to search for the Masked Man and met them. They became allies in the final battle. The Lost Boys were adopted by Red Riding Hood and Froggy, and all the rest of the characters went back to their respective stories; Merlin took Mother Goose with him. 
Hagatha was a witch who practiced dark magic, who took advantage of Ezmia the Enchantress. She was killed when she fell into the Thornbush Pit.
Hagetta is the sister of the vile witch, Hagatha. She is a healer who uses white dragon flames. She is a major ally of the heroes.
Traveling Tradesman is the person who sold the magic beans to Jack. He is an ally to the heroes, and although they generally dislike him, he proves to be helpful at times.
Medusa is a person with a head of hair made of snakes and eyes that turn anyone who looks at them to stone. Although she does these things, she doesn't mean to and finds the cave full of both citizens and royals. she later finds Morina's hut, drinks a potion and (for a short time) turns back into a human. she helps free Froggy from the mirror and saves the missing children, proving that she is not a monster. she then decides (after Froggy offers) to live out her days in Froggy's old house.

Reception
The Wishing Spell was on the New York Times Bestseller List for five weeks, and reached No. 1 for two of the five.
The Onion'''s The A.V. Club gave The Wishing Spell a B.The Wishing Spell was named one of Barnes & Noble's "Best Books of 2012".

 Film adaptation 
On June 13, 2017, it was announced that Twentieth Century Fox is developing a film adaptation of the first book, The Wishing Spell'', with Colfer directing and writing the screenplay. He will also serve as one of the executive producers on the film, which will be produced by 21 Laps Entertainment.

References

External links

 

American children's novels
Children's fantasy novels
Novels based on fairy tales
Series of children's books